Tiago Rafael 'Rafa' Freitas Costa (born 27 January 1991) is a Portuguese footballer who plays for F.C. Lixa as a right winger.

External links

Rafa Costa at ZeroZero

1991 births
Living people
People from Vizela
Portuguese footballers
Association football wingers
Primeira Liga players
Liga Portugal 2 players
Segunda Divisão players
Vitória S.C. players
A.D. Lousada players
Portimonense S.C. players
Moreirense F.C. players
F.C. Felgueiras 1932 players
C.D. Cinfães players
Juventude de Pedras Salgadas players
Rebordosa A.C. players
F.C. Lixa players
Portugal youth international footballers
Sportspeople from Braga District